Amanda Doherty (born September 16, 1997) is an American professional golfer who plays on the LPGA Tour.

Amateur career
She started playing golf at 13.

Professional career
She turned professional in 2020, playing on the Symetra Tour through 2021. She played in nine events, making the cut in seven of them. She tied for fifth at the IOA Golf Classic on September 27. In 2021, she played in 19 events, making 15 cuts, including eight top-10 finishes. She placed runner-up at the IOA Golf Classic on May 23.

She carried a one-stroke lead after 54 holes (three rounds) with a 12-under-par on August 11, in the ISPS Handa World Invitational, in Ballymena, Northern Ireland, over Peiyun Chien and Georgia Hall. She finished tied for eighth, with a final score of 280 (−11), her highest place in a tournament.

Personal life
She graduated from The Galloway School, a private school in Atlanta, Georgia, in 2016, before attending Florida State University where she played her collegiate golf with the Florida State Seminoles women's golf team. She graduated in 2020, with a degree in Sport management. When not playing golf, she likes to play the guitar and draw.

Results in LPGA majors

CUT = missed the half-way cut
T = tied

Summary

LPGA Tour career summary

^ Official as of 2022 season
* Includes matchplay and other tournaments without a cut.

World ranking
Position in Women's World Golf Rankings at the end of each calendar year.

References

External links

American female golfers
LPGA Tour golfers
Florida State Seminoles women's golfers
Golfers from Atlanta
1997 births
Living people
21st-century American women